Gloucester Court of Probate is a grade II listed building at 3–4 Pitt Street, Gloucester in England.

It was designed by Thomas Fulljames of Fulljames & Waller in 1858 in a "picturesque Gothic style" and built by Oliver Estcourt at a cost of £1,100. The building has been converted to offices and is no longer in use as a court.

References 

Grade II listed buildings in Gloucestershire
Former courthouses in England
Probate courts
Thomas Fulljames buildings
Courts and tribunals with year of establishment missing